North Dakota is the 2002 album by Tom Brosseau. It was produced, mixed, and recorded by Gregory Page in San Diego, CA and released on Page's Bed Pan Records label.

Album insight
Only (200) copies of North Dakota were produced, and while it remains an unreleased studio album, "Heart of Mine" was included on Empty Houses are Lonely, "Grafton, ND" was later reworked and released on What I Mean To Say Is Goodbye, and "The Horses Will Not Ride, The Gospel Won't Be Spoken" and "Fit To Be Tied" were later rewritten and re-recorded and included on North Dakota Impressions (2016).

Track listing
"Portrait of George Washington"
"Heart of Mine"
"Will Henry"
"Luke"
"Drayton, ND"
"Grafton, ND"
"The Horses Will Not Ride, The Gospel Won't Be Spoken"
"Old Piano Blues"
"Fare Thee Well Thee Wed"
"Fit To Be Tied"

Personnel
 Tom Brosseau: vocals, acoustic guitar, banjo, harmonica, piano
 Gregory Page: Pump organ, additional guitars
 Wes Tudar: Cello

References

Tom Brosseau albums
2002 albums
Music of North Dakota